James Clark Baker (13 November 1866 – 1 February 1939), also known as James Clark, was an English-born New Zealand cricketer who played first-class cricket for Otago between the 1889/90 and 1906/07 seasons. Baker was born at London in England. In 1902 he scored Otago's first century in first-class cricket.

Cricket career
After two unsuccessful matches for Otago in 1889–90, Baker played a leading part in Otago's victory over Canterbury in 1890–91. In a match in which only 443 runs were scored, Otago needed 121 runs to win and were 32 for 7 before Baker, displaying "unsuspected virtuosity", attacked the bowling and finished on 45 not out in a one-wicket victory.

For the rest of his career he usually opened the batting. He scored his first fifty in 1894–95, when he made 80, the only fifty in the match, against Fiji. He also made the highest score of the match when he scored 53 in Otago's victory over Canterbury in 1895–96.

"A splendid batsman and a most attractive player to watch", Baker played his first match for New Zealand in 1896–97 against the Australians, when New Zealand fielded a side of 15. Later in the season he scored 36 and 19 in New Zealand's victory over Queensland. He was one of the three players who formed the selection committee on New Zealand's short tour of Australia in 1898-99, when he was the leading run-scorer in the two first-class matches (109 at 27.25) and in all matches (290 at 41.42).

He played for the Grange club in Dunedin. When he made 103, Otago's first-ever century, on New Year's Day 1902 at the Carisbrook ground against Hawke's Bay, the Otago Daily Times said "the burly Grange man gave an exhibition that is not likely to be eclipsed for many a day ... his strokes were powerful and clean". He brought up his century with a four to leg off the bowling of Albert Trott, and added 171 for the fourth wicket with his captain, Albert Geddes. It was the only century scored in New Zealand first-class cricket in 1901–02. Otago won the match by an innings; it was their 62nd first-class match.

The New Zealand cricket historian Tom Reese regarded Baker as the best batsman in New Zealand in the 1890s, describing him as "a solid player in every way, at home on fast or slow wickets, and combining good defence with hitting ability".

Personal life
He was christened "James Clark". He changed his name to that of his stepfather and played during his cricket career as "James Baker", then changed back to Clark later. His son Bernie Clark played cricket for Otago in the 1930s.

He played Rugby for Alhambra in Dunedin, and also represented Otago.

On the day of Baker's funeral the Otago and Canterbury players paused for a minute or two during their Plunket Shield match at Carisbrook as a mark of respect.

References

External links
 

1866 births
1939 deaths
New Zealand cricketers
Pre-1930 New Zealand representative cricketers
Otago cricketers
New Zealand rugby union players
Otago rugby union players
New Zealand people of English descent
South Island cricketers